Monaco was represented by one athlete at the 2010 European Athletics Championships held in Barcelona, Spain.

Participants 

Brice Etes (born 11 April 1984) has broken the National Record on 800m, 1:47.61, during the Herculis Meeting (Diamond League) in Monaco, on 22 July 2010.

Results

Men
Track and road events

References 
 Participants list (men)
 Participants list (women)

2010
Nations at the 2010 European Athletics Championships
European Athletics Championships